Palca District is one of ten districts of the province Tacna in Peru.

Geography 
The Barroso mountain range traverses the district. Some of the highest mountains of the district are listed below:

References